Professor David James Kerr CBE (born 1956, Glasgow) is a British Cancer Researcher. His primary area of research is treatment and management of colorectal cancer.

He served as Chief Research Advisor, at Sidra Medical and Research Center in Doha, Qatar.  Kerr is no longer the Director of Qatar's Biomedical Research Institute; his role as a Member of the Supreme Council of Health in Qatar has been allocated to Lord Darzi.
Kerr is Professor of Cancer Medicine and Former Fellow of Corpus Christi College, Oxford. He is also President-Elect for European Society for Medical Oncology (2009).

Kerr’s clinical research into adjuvant therapy of early-stage colorectal cancer has contributed to saving thousands of lives over the past two decades.

Early life and education
Kerr was born in 1956 in Glasgow. He attended Dunard Street Primary School, Maryhill, and Eastwood High Secondary School. Knowing from a relatively early age that he wanted to become a doctor having read A. J. Cronin's The Citadel as a child, he went on to study biochemistry and medicine at Glasgow University, and subsequently became an ontological clinical scientist following specialist and fellowship training within the Department of Medical Oncology at the University of Glasgow under Professor S. Kaye (1984–1992).

Career
Beginning in March 1992, Kerr served as Professor of Clinical Oncology at the University of Birmingham and Director of the Clinical Trials Unit where he and Professor Alan Rickinson built the Institute of Cancer Studies.

In 1994, he was appointed Clinical Director of the Regional Cancer Task Force for the West Midlands. There, he developed a "hub and spoke" Network model for cancer services in the region. The key elements of the plan are:
Site specialization by cancer surgeons and oncologists
Multidisciplinary working
Development of regional treatment guidelines (often precursor of national guidelines)
Use of IT as a social glue to bind the network together.

He undertook the first national audit of cancer waiting times for Sir Kenneth Calman, who was then Chief Medical Officer which was one of the drivers which led to the Government creating a National Cancer Plan.

In 2001, he was appointed Rhodes Professor of Clinical pharmacology and Cancer Therapeutics and Head of the Department of Clinical Pharmacology at the University of Oxford.  At the same time, he was also asked by the Secretary of State for Health Alan Milburn to undertake a review of NHS research strategy into cancer. The resultant blueprint for the provision of infrastructure to support clinical cancer research in the UK led to the establishment of the NHS Cancer Research Network (NCRN) and the National Translational Cancer Research Network (NTRAC). Kerr was subsequently appointed the Director of NTRAC.

He subsequently worked with colleagues to build an Institute of Cancer Medicine and Cancer Treatment Center in Oxford.

In 2004, Kerr was invited by Scotland’s First Minister to chair the work of a National Framework Advisory Group to consider the future shape of the NHS in Scotland.  This Group produced three volumes of work, "Building a Health Service Fit for the Future" (Vol I and II) and a web-based data link showing the Reports from the individual action teams. This has been adopted as the blueprint for Scotland’s NHS over the next 20 years.

In 2009, David Kerr took a leave of absence from Oxford University to become the Chief Research Advisor at the Sidra Medical and Research Center. In April 2009, he became a Member of the Supreme Council of Health. He is no longer working for Sidra having moved back to the UK 
Kerr has made a substantial contribution to cancer care and research in Europe.  He co-chaired the Anglo-French Scientific committee celebrating the centenary of the Entente-Cordiale (2004) after the Queen and President Chirac nominated cancer research as their joint theme.  He has established the first Network of India's top cancer centers, turning it into an internationally recognized trials network and has trained many young Indian oncologists.

He has brought worldwide attention to the looming epidemic of cancer which will claim the lives of more than a million Africans every year. He organized the first ever African Cancer Reform convention in London (2007).  This was attended by 27 African Health ministries, led to the London Declaration calling for immediate action to develop cancer control plans for these nations.  Subsequently Kerr was asked by African ministers to lead a new organization, AfrOx to aid national cancer planning in Africa.  AfrOx has already received unprecedented international support (WHO, IAEA) and is seen as a beacon to establish cancer care in Africa.  He has completed a National Cancer Plan for Ghana, has been invited by the governments of Rwanda, Nigeria and Sierra Leone to lead their cancer plan activities, has initiated a mass vaccination program for cervical cancer, the commonest cancer affecting African women, and is coordinating the International Oncology Association's engagement in this field.

Kerr spoke at the New Frontiers in Science Diplomacy event and blogged on the Guardian about it.

Published works

Kerr has published over 350 papers in peer reviewed journals. His primary areas of research are colorectal cancer and gene therapy.  He has been awarded several patents which have led to spin out biotech companies – Cobra Therapeutics, Oxford Cancer Biomarkers, and Celleron Therapeutics.

He sits on a number of general editorial boards including Nature Reviews Clinical Oncology journal.

Awards
1987: European School of Oncology International Award for outstanding contribution to chemotherapy research
1995: Fellow of Royal College of Physicians and Surgeons, Glasgow
1996: Fellow of Royal College of Physicians, London
1999: 2nd International Prize for Excellence in the field of Colorectal Cancer Research and Treatment – Awarded by International Drug Development Centre and European Association for Research into Gastrointestinal Cancer
2000: Fellow of the Academy of Medical Sciences
2000: NHS Nye Bevan Award for Innovation
2002: Appointed Commander of the Order of the British Empire
2006: European Society for Medical Oncology Award for distinguished contribution to Cancer therapy and research in Europe
2006: Distinguished Medieval Lecture, University of Manchester
2007: Honorary Fellowship of the Royal College of General Practitioners
2007: Fulton Lecture, University of Glasgow
2008: Bruce Cain Memorial Lecture, Cancer Societies of Australia and New Zealand
2017: Distinguished Harvard Global Health Catalyst Award, Boston, USA

References

External links
Kerr's official web page
Afrox
Indox
Celleron 
Cobra Therapeutics
Oxford University's Experimental Therapeutics Programme

1956 births
Living people
Alumni of the University of Glasgow
Cancer researchers
Commanders of the Order of the British Empire
Fellows of the Academy of Medical Sciences (United Kingdom)
Fellows of Corpus Christi College, Oxford
Fellows of the Royal College of General Practitioners
Fellows of the Royal College of Physicians
20th-century Scottish medical doctors
21st-century Scottish medical doctors
British oncologists
Medical doctors from Glasgow
Academics of the University of Birmingham